Vriesea capixabae is a plant species in the genus Vriesea. This species is endemic to Brazil.

References

capixabae
Flora of Brazil